Delhi Food Banking Network is a food bank system based in Delhi, India.

The populations being serviced by the Delhi FoodBank include school programs, charitable hospitals, orphanages, the destitute, beggars, homeless, faith based organisations and many others.

The Foodbank operates by matching food from donors to those that need this the most.

See also 
 List of food banks

Notes

References 
 
 
 

Food banks
Organisations based in Delhi